The 2015–16 UEFA Europa League was the 45th season of Europe's secondary club football tournament organised by UEFA, and the seventh season since it was renamed from the UEFA Cup to the UEFA Europa League.

The 2016 UEFA Europa League Final was played between Liverpool and Sevilla at the St. Jakob-Park in Basel, Switzerland, and won by Sevilla, their fifth title (extending their own record) and third win in a row (also a tournament record).

Sevilla initially started the 2015–16 European club season in the Champions League as the Europa League title holders, but qualified for the Europa League by finishing third in the Champions League group stage, and successfully defended their title. As the winners of the 2015–16 UEFA Europa League, they qualified for the 2016–17 UEFA Champions League, and also earned the right to play against the winners of the 2015–16 UEFA Champions League, Real Madrid, in the 2016 UEFA Super Cup.

Format changes
The UEFA Executive Committee held in May and September 2013 approved the following changes to the UEFA Europa League starting from the 2015–16 season (for the three-year cycle until the 2017–18 season):
The title holders of the UEFA Europa League will qualify for the UEFA Champions League, and therefore no Europa League berth will be reserved for them (although it is still possible for them to defend their title if they drop down to the Europa League after Champions League elimination).
All associations will have a maximum of three teams entering the Europa League (excluding those transferred from the Champions League); previously associations 7–9 each had four entrants (the only exception is when both the Champions League title holders and the Europa League title holders are from the same top three ranked association and do not qualify for either the Champions League or Europa League through domestic competitions, and the fourth-placed team of their association enter the Europa League instead of the Champions League because a maximum of five teams from one association can enter the Champions League, meaning in this case, four teams from their association enter the Europa League).
The number of teams directly qualifying for the group stage will be increased to 16 teams (from the top 12 associations); previously six teams (from the top six associations) directly qualified for the group stage.
Should the domestic cup winners qualify for the Champions League, the cup runners-up will no longer be granted a spot in the Europa League, and the spot will be given to the highest-placed team in the league which have not yet qualified for European competitions.

Association team allocation
A total of 191 teams from all 54 UEFA member associations participated in the 2015–16 UEFA Europa League. The association ranking based on the UEFA country coefficients was used to determine the number of participating teams for each association:
Associations 1–51 (except Liechtenstein) each have three teams qualify.
 As the winners of the 2014–15 UEFA Europa League, Sevilla qualified for the 2015–16 UEFA Champions League; the 2015–16 UEFA Europa League berth they would otherwise have earned for finishing 5th in the 2014–15 La Liga was vacated and not passed to another Spanish team.
Associations 52–53 each have two teams qualify.
Liechtenstein and Gibraltar each have one team qualify (Liechtenstein organises only a domestic cup and no domestic league; Gibraltar as per decision by the UEFA Executive Committee).
The top three associations of the 2014–15 UEFA Respect Fair Play ranking each gain an additional berth (the 2015–16 season will be the last where Fair Play berths are allocated to the Europa League).
Moreover, 33 teams eliminated from the 2015–16 UEFA Champions League are transferred to the Europa League.

Association ranking
For the 2015–16 UEFA Europa League, the associations were allocated places according to their 2014 UEFA country coefficients, which took into account their performance in European competitions from 2009–10 to 2013–14.

Apart from the allocation based on the country coefficients, associations may have additional teams participating in the Europa League, as noted below:
 – Additional berth via Fair Play ranking (Netherlands, England, Republic of Ireland)
 – Additional teams transferred from Champions League
 – Vacated berth due to Europa League title holders playing in Champions League

Distribution
In the default access list, Sevilla enter the group stage (as the fifth-placed team of the 2014–15 La Liga). However, since they qualified for the Champions League as the Europa League title holders, the spot which they qualified for in the Europa League group stage is vacated, and the following changes to the default allocation system are made:
The domestic cup winners of association 13 (Switzerland) are promoted from the third qualifying round to the group stage.
The domestic cup winners of association 18 (Cyprus) are promoted from the second qualifying round to the third qualifying round.
The domestic cup winners of associations 24 (Sweden) and 25 (Bulgaria) are promoted from the first qualifying round to the second qualifying round.

Redistribution rules
A Europa League place is vacated when a team qualifies for both the Champions League and the Europa League, or qualifies for the Europa League by more than one method. When a place is vacated, it is redistributed within the national association by the following rules (regulations Articles 3.03 and 3.04):
When the domestic cup winners (considered as the "highest-placed" qualifier within the national association with the latest starting round) also qualify for the Champions League, their Europa League place is vacated. As a result, the highest-placed team in the league which have not yet qualified for European competitions qualify for the Europa League, with the Europa League qualifiers which finish above them in the league moved up one "place" (the 2015–16 season will be the first with this particular arrangement where the domestic cup runners-up are no longer guaranteed a place in the Europa League in this scenario).
When the domestic cup winners also qualify for the Europa League through league position, their place through the league position is vacated. As a result, the highest-placed team in the league which have not yet qualified for European competitions qualify for the Europa League, with the Europa League qualifiers which finish above them in the league moved up one "place" if possible.
For associations where a Europa League place is reserved for the League Cup winners, they always qualify for the Europa League as the "lowest-placed" qualifier. If the League Cup winners have already qualified for European competitions through other methods, this reserved Europa League place is taken by the highest-placed team in the league which have not yet qualified for European competitions.
A Fair Play place is taken by the highest-ranked team in the domestic Fair Play table which have not yet qualified for European competitions.

Teams
The labels in the parentheses show how each team qualified for the place of its starting round:
TH: Title holders
CW: Cup winners
2nd, 3rd, 4th, 5th, 6th, etc.: League position
LC: League Cup winners
PW: End-of-season Europa League play-off winners
FP: Fair Play
CL: Transferred from Champions League
GS: Third-placed teams from group stage
PO: Losers from play-off round
Q3: Losers from third qualifying round

Notably two teams took part in the competition that were not playing in their national top-division. They were Go Ahead Eagles (2nd tier) and UCD (2nd tier).

Notes

Round and draw dates
The schedule of the competition is as follows (all draws are held at UEFA headquarters in Nyon, Switzerland, unless stated otherwise).

Matches in the qualifying, play-off, and knockout rounds may also be played on Tuesdays or Wednesdays instead of the regular Thursdays due to scheduling conflicts.

Qualifying rounds

In the qualifying rounds and the play-off round, teams are divided into seeded and unseeded teams based on their 2015 UEFA club coefficients, and then drawn into two-legged home-and-away ties. Teams from the same association cannot be drawn against each other.

First qualifying round
The draw for the first and second qualifying round was held on 22 June 2015. With 102 teams involved, it was UEFA's biggest ever tournament draw. The first legs were played on 30 June and 2 July, and the second legs were played on 7 and 9 July 2015.

Second qualifying round
The first legs were played on 16 July, and the second legs were played on 21 and 23 July 2015.

Third qualifying round
The draw for the third qualifying round was held on 17 July 2015. The first legs were played on 29 and 30 July, and the second legs were played on 6 August 2015.

Play-off round

The draw for the play-off round was held on 7 August 2015. The first legs were played on 20 August, and the second legs were played on 27 August 2015.

Group stage

The draw for the group stage was held in Monaco on 28 August 2015. The 48 teams were drawn into twelve groups of four, with the restriction that teams from the same association could not be drawn against each other. For the draw, the teams were seeded into four pots based on their 2015 UEFA club coefficients.

In each group, teams played against each other home-and-away in a round-robin format. The group winners and runners-up advanced to the round of 32, where they were joined by the eight third-placed teams of the 2015–16 UEFA Champions League group stage. The matchdays were 17 September, 1 October, 22 October, 5 November, 26 November, and 10 December 2015.

A total of 24 national associations were represented in the group stage. Augsburg, Belenenses, Gabala, Groningen, Midtjylland, Monaco, Sion and Skënderbeu Korçë made their debut appearances in the group stage (although Monaco have appeared in the UEFA Cup group stage). Skënderbeu Korçë were the first team from Albania to play in the group stage of any UEFA club competition.

Group A

Group B

Group C

Group D

Group E

Group F

Group G

Group H

Group I

Group J

Group K

Group L

Knockout phase

In the knockout phase, teams played against each other over two legs on a home-and-away basis, except for the one-match final. The mechanism of the draws for each round was as follows:
In the draw for the round of 32, the twelve group winners and the four third-placed teams from the Champions League group stage with the better group records were seeded, and the twelve group runners-up and the other four third-placed teams from the Champions League group stage were unseeded. The seeded teams were drawn against the unseeded teams, with the seeded teams hosting the second leg. Teams from the same group or the same association could not be drawn against each other.
In the draws for the round of 16 onwards, there were no seedings, and teams from the same group or the same association could be drawn against each other.

Bracket

Round of 32
The draw for the round of 32 was held on 14 December 2015. The first legs were played on 16 and 18 February, and the second legs were played on 24 and 25 February 2016.

Round of 16
The draw for the round of 16 was held on 26 February 2016. The first legs were played on 10 March, and the second legs were played on 17 March 2016.

Quarter-finals
The draw for the quarter-finals was held on 18 March 2016. The first legs were played on 7 April, and the second legs were played on 14 April 2016.

Semi-finals
The draw for the semi-finals was held on 15 April 2016. The first legs were played on 28 April, and the second legs were played on 5 May 2016.

Final

The final was played on 18 May 2016 at the St. Jakob-Park in Basel, Switzerland. The "home" team (for administrative purposes) was determined by an additional draw held after the semi-final draw.

Statistics
Statistics exclude qualifying rounds and play-off round.

Top goalscorers

Top assists

Squad of the Season
The UEFA technical study group selected the following 18 players as the squad of the tournament.

See also
2015–16 UEFA Champions League
2016 UEFA Super Cup

Note

References

External links

2015–16 UEFA Europa League

 
2
2015-16